West Virginia's 1st congressional district is currently located in the southern half of the state. 

Responding to the census results, the state legislature adopted a new map for the 2022 elections and the following 10 years.  It abandoned the practice used since the formation of the state of starting the numbering in the north, and rather divided the state in a northern and southern district, with the 1st being the more southerly one.  The new 1st district contains the counties of Boone, Braxton, Cabell, Calhoun, Clay, Fayette, Gilmer, Greenbrier, Jackson, Kanawha, Lincoln, Logan, Mason, McDowell, Mercer, Mingo, Monroe, Nicholas, Pendleton, Pocahontas, Putnam, Raleigh, Roane, Summers, Wayne, Webster, Wirt, and Wyoming.  For all intents and purposes, it was the successor to the 3rd district, and its congresswoman, Carol Miller, became the de facto incumbent in this new district. The state's other congressmen, Republicans David McKinley and Alex Mooney, were both drawn into the new 2nd district.  All three ran for re-election.  Miller was easily nominated in the Republican Primary held May 10, 2022, while former 1st district congressman David McKinley was soundly defeated by 2nd district congressman Alex Mooney.    Both Republicans were easily elected in November.  

In its previous incarnation, the 1st covered the northern part of the state, and was historically the most regularly drawn district in the state. From 1953 to 2023, it was represented by only four men: Bob Mollohan (D) (1953–1957), former Governor Arch Moore, Jr. (R) (1957–1969), Bob Mollohan again (1969–1983), Alan Mollohan (1983–2011) and McKinley (2011-2023).

Despite the lack of turnover in the congressional seat, historically the 1st was not safe for either party.  The cities are ancestrally Democratic strongholds, while the rural areas were much more conservative and had a tendency to swing Republican more often.  As late as 2014, state legislators were roughly split between both parties.

For most of the 20th century, the Democratic vote in the cities was enough to keep the district in Democratic hands.  However, West Virginia Democrats tend to be somewhat more socially conservative than their counterparts in the rest of the nation, and the district has been swept up in the growing Republican trend in the state at the national level. No Democrat since Bill Clinton (who did so by a plurality in a three-way race) has carried the 1st District in presidential elections. George W. Bush carried the district both times in 2000 with 54% of the vote and 2004 with 58% of the vote. John McCain carried the district in 2008 with 56.77% of the vote while Barack Obama received 41.51%.

History

Prior to the 2020 redistricting, the First District had always been anchored in Wheeling, and as such had always included Hancock, Brooke, Ohio, Marshall, and Wetzel counties–the five counties usually reckoned as the Northern Panhandle. The original 1863 districting included also Tyler, Pleasants, Doddridge, Harrison, Ritchie, Wood, Wirt, Gilmer, Calhoun and Lewis counties.  It was essentially the successor of Virginia's 11th congressional district.

In 1882, the counties of Tyler, Doddridge, Harrison, Gilmer, Lewis and Braxton were added to the core counties.  In 1902, the core counties were joined by Marion, Harrison, and Lewis counties. In the 1916 redistricting it included only the five core counties and Marion and Taylor. The district was unchanged in the 1934 and 1954 redistrictings. In 1962, Braxton, Calhoun, Doddridge, Gilmer, Harrison, Lewis, Marion and Taylor joined the five core counties. The 1972 redistricting added Tyler, Pleasants, and Woods and deleted Taylor.  The 1982 redistricting added Taylor back to the district.

For 1992 the district consisted of Barbour, Brooke, Doddridge, Grant, Hancock, Harrison, Marion, Marshall, Mineral, Monongalia, Ohio, Pleasants, Preston, Ritchie, Taylor, Tucker, Tyler, Wetzel and Wood counties.  In 2002 Gilmer was added.  For the election cycle that began in 2012 the district was unchanged.

For the 2020 Census, the legislature abandoned the practice of numbering the districts from north to south and the First District was now the more southerly one, consisting of Boone, Braxton, Cabell, Calhoun, Clay, Fayette, Gilmer, Greenbrier, Jackson, Kanawha, Lincoln, Logan, Mason, McDowell, Mercer, Mingo, Monroe, Nicholas, Pendleton, Pocahontas, Putnam, Raleigh, Roane, Summers, Wayne, Webster, Wirt, and Wyoming counties.

Recent presidential elections

List of members representing the district

Recent election results

2000s

2010s

2020s

Historical district boundaries

See also

West Virginia's congressional districts
List of United States congressional districts

References
Specific

General

 Congressional Biographical Directory of the United States 1774–present

01